The 32nd Guangdong–Hong Kong Cup was held in December 2009 and January 2010. The first leg was played at Siu Sai Wan Sports Ground on 29 December, with the second leg to take place at Zhaoqing Sports Center on 2 January.

Hong Kong won Guangdong 2–1 in the first leg with Julius Akosah scoring two goals in his first game for Hong Kong. However, Guangdong won the second leg 2–0 with Li Jian scoring two goals. Guangdong, with a final aggregate score of 2–3, won the Guangdong-Hong Kong Cup and denied Hong Kong the chance to win the Cup for four consecutive times.

Squads

Guangdong
The squad was announced by Guangdong Sunray Cave and Guangzhou Pharmaceutical in December 2009.
General manager:  Ke Guohong
Assistant general manager:  Yan Zhongjian,  Chen weihao
Manager:  Cao Yang
Assistant coach:  Guan Zhirui,  Zhong Weimin,  He Weiwen,  Guo Jianhua
Physio:  Chen Xiaojun

Hong Kong
The squad was announced on 21 December 2009. Since South China, TSW Pegasus, NT Realty Wofoo Tai Po and Tai Chung had a game on 3 January 2010, Yan Lik Kin and player from these teams did not feature in the team.
Director:  Pui Ho Wang
Manager:  Chow Man Shun,  Yu Chung Hang
Honorary manager:  Li Kwok Hung
Head coach:  Yan Lik Kin
Assistant coach:  Szeto Man Chun
Goalkeeping coach:  Chu Kwok Kuen
Physio:  Lui Yat Hong
Doctor:  Chang Hsi Tse

|-----
! colspan="9" bgcolor="#B0D3FB" align="left" |
|----- bgcolor="#DFEDFD"

Match details

First leg

Second leg

References
Hong Kong Football Association - 2009-12 Match Schedule
Hong Kong Football Association - 2010-01 Match Schedule

 

2009–10 in Hong Kong football
2010 in Chinese football
2009-10